Petticoat Larceny is a 1943 American comedy film directed by Ben Holmes from an original screenplay by Jack Townley and Stuart Palmer. The film stars Ruth Warrick, Joan Carroll, and Walter Reed, and was released by RKO Radio Pictures (who also produced the film) on July 7, 1943.

Plot
Radio child star Joan Mitchell appears on a popular crime series called "Undercover Angel," but she's fed up with what she believes are the corny scripts, complaining that real children don't speak like that. She decides to "research" her role by investigating actual criminals. She's discovered snooping in their home by a trio of goofy, small time crooks, who, believing she's an orphan, take her in and agree to teach her some tricks of the trade. Meanwhile, her sudden disappearance has everyone naturally assuming she's been kidnapped, and things take a turn for the worse when she's recognized and snatched for real—so her new guardians take it upon themselves to rescue her.

Cast
 Ruth Warrick as Pat Mitchell
 Joan Carroll as Joan Mitchell/Small Change
 Walter Reed as Bill Morgan
 Wally Brown as Sam Colfax
 Tom Kennedy as Pinky
 Jimmy Conlin as Jitters
 Vince Barnett as Stogie
 Paul Guilfoyle as Joe 'Tinhorn' Foster
 Grant Withers as Detective Hogan
 Earl S. Dewey as Mr. J. C. Crandall
 Charles Coleman as Higgins the Butler
 Cliff Clark as Lieutenant Hackett

References

External links
 
 
 
 

1943 films
1943 comedy films
American comedy films
American black-and-white films
Films scored by Roy Webb
Films directed by Ben Holmes
RKO Pictures films
Films produced by Bert Gilroy
1940s English-language films
1940s American films